Cirrothauma is a genus of deep water octopuses from the cirrate family Cirroteuthidae. The species Cirrothauma are fragile, gelatinous deep-sea octopods with a shell, a moderate saddle, and triangular wings. Their eyes either have lenses, as seen in the species Cirrothauma murrayi or they have reduced eyes without lenses, shown in the other extant species Cirrothauma magna. Both species were placed in Cirrothauma due to the fact that they possess similar shells. These octopuses have been reported to live in all the world's oceans, except for the Southern Ocean.

Species
There are two currently recognised species within the genus Cirrothauma

Cirrothauma magna (Hoyle, 1885)
Cirrothauma murrayi Chun, 1911

References

Octopuses
Cephalopod genera